Hunter Alan Scott (born June 9, 1985) is best known for the research he did on the sinking of  as a sixth-grade student, which led to a United States Congressional investigation and exoneration for its captain.

Research into the USS Indianapolis sinking
Scott interviewed nearly 150 survivors of the Indianapolis sinking and reviewed 800 documents. He concluded that the ship's Captain Charles Butler McVay III, who had been blamed for the tragedy, was innocent.

National reaction
With the support of his Congressman, Joe Scarborough (R-FL), Scott's research brought attention to the Indianapolis sinking and resultant heavy loss of life. Scott appeared before the US Congress with survivors of Indianapolis to argue that McVay should be exonerated. In his testimony, Scott said: "This is Captain McVay's dog tag from when he was a cadet at the Naval Academy. As you can see, it has his thumbprint on the back. I carry this as a reminder of my mission in the memory of a man who ended his own life in 1968. I carry this dog tag to remind me that only in the United States can one person make a difference no matter what the age. I carry this dog tag to remind me of the privilege and responsibility that I have to carry forward the torch of honor passed to me by the men of the USS Indianapolis."

The testimonies of Scott and the Indianapolis Survivors Organization resulted in the passage of a Congressional resolution, signed by President Bill Clinton in October 2000, exonerating McVay.

Scott's efforts received national media attention. Florida governor Jeb Bush declared August 24, 2001 "Hunter Scott Day." Scott was featured in George Magazine as "one of the most intriguing political figures" of the year. In 2004, Scott spoke at events surrounding the dedication of the National World War II Memorial in Washington, D.C.

Later life
Scott studied economics and physics at the University of North Carolina at Chapel Hill, on a Naval ROTC scholarship, and graduated in May 2007. Lieutenant Hunter Scott, a Naval Aviator, served as a flight deck officer aboard .

Scott's story and that of Indianapolis were told in Left for Dead: A Young Man's Search for Justice for the USS Indianapolis by Pete Nelson. Scott supplied the preface to Nelson's book.

References

1985 births
Living people
American military writers
Military personnel from Florida
People from Pensacola, Florida
United States Naval Aviators
University of North Carolina at Chapel Hill alumni
Writers from Florida